Matthew Norman Hart (born 16 May 1972) is a former New Zealand cricketer. Hart, a left-arm orthodox spinner, played in 14 Tests between 1994 and 1996, claiming 29 wickets including one five-wicket haul against South Africa.

He also appeared in 13 ODIs, claiming 13 wickets, including a then-record haul by a New Zealander in One Day Internationals, claiming 5/22 against the West Indies in 1994. His international career lasted from 1994 to 2002, eventually losing his place in the team to Daniel Vettori. Hart retired from cricket in 2005 at the age of 33, citing a loss of enthusiasm for the game.

His brother, Robbie, also played cricket as a wicket-keeper for Northern Districts Knights and New Zealand.

References

Doping cases in cricket
1972 births
Living people
New Zealand Test cricketers
New Zealand One Day International cricketers
Cricketers at the 1999 Cricket World Cup
New Zealand cricketers
Northern Districts cricketers
Cricketers from Hamilton, New Zealand
North Island cricketers